Tenure may refer to:

 Academic tenure, indefinite academic position 
 Land tenure, legal ownership of land
 Tenure (film), a 2009 comedy-drama
 Tigh an Iúir, a village in County Louth, Ireland